The Avers Rhine is a tributary of the Hinterrhein/Rein Posteriur in the Swiss canton of Graubünden.

Course 

It rises in Avers at the confluence of the Bergalgabach with the slightly smaller Jufer Rhine. The Jufer Rhine rises in, and is named after, Juf, the highest permanent settlement in Europe, near the border with Albula district. When it reaches the valley floor, it meets the slightly smaller Madrish Rhine.

After a few kilometers, it is joined from the left by the Reno di Lei, which flows almost entirely on Italian soil.  The Lago di Lei reservoir is also on Italian soil, except for the dam which creates it, which was erected on Swiss territory.

The Avers Rhine continues its way through the Val Ferrera valley, which contains two populated places.  The upper village is Innerferrera, where the river is dammed, forming the Innerferrera reservoir since 1961.  Below Ausserferrera, the glacial valley is flanked by steep rocky slopes.  The Avers Rhine then flows into the Hinterrhein in the Rofla Gorge above Andeer.

The road in the Ferrera valley is a cul de sac.

Tributaries

Left tributaries 
 Bergalgabach (largest headwater of the Avers Rhine)
 Madrish Rhine
 Reno di Lei
 Ual da Niemet

Right tributaries 
 Jufer Rhine
 Maleggabach
 Ava da Starlera
 Ava da Mulegn
 Aua Granda

Footnotes 

Rivers of Switzerland
Rivers of Graubünden
Avers